The Coupe du Mali Orange for sponsorship reasons is the top knockout tournament of the Malien football.

The competition is the only one where some of the clubs who won titles are based outside Bamako, the Malian capital.

Winners

References

Football competitions in Mali
Malien
1961 establishments in Mali
Recurring sporting events established in 1961